Munt may refer to:

People 
 A family name Munt:
 Janice Munt (born 1955), Australian politician
 Natalie Munt (born 1977), British badminton player
 Sally Rowena Munt, British feminist and academic
 Sílvia Munt
 Tessa Munt (born 1959), British politician
Alice Munt and William Munt, two of the Colchester Martyrs

Other uses 
 Arenys de Munt, a municipality in Catalonia, Spain
 A Zimbabwean ethnic slur for black people

See also
 De Munt (disambiguation)
 Vermunt (disambiguation)